Virginia Trunk & Bag Company is a historic factory complex located at Petersburg, Virginia. It was constructed in several phases between 1903 and about 1931.  The two contributing buildings are the trunk factory building (1903) and storage and shipping building (1903).  The two buildings are connected by two enclosed pedestrian bridges. The trunk factory is a four-story brick building with a number of additions. The storage and shipping building is a three- and four-story brick building.  The railroad spur is a contributing site.

It was listed on the National Register of Historic Places in 2009.

References

Industrial buildings and structures on the National Register of Historic Places in Virginia
Industrial buildings completed in 1903
Buildings and structures in Petersburg, Virginia
National Register of Historic Places in Petersburg, Virginia
Luggage manufacturers